Ameipsis is a genus of beetles in the family Cerambycidae, containing a single species, Ameipsis marginicollis. It was described by Pascoe in 1865.

References

Acanthocinini
Beetles described in 1865
Monotypic Cerambycidae genera